Frearanova fuscostictica is a species of beetle in the family Cerambycidae, and the only species in the genus Frearanova. It was described by Breuning in 1958.

References

Crossotini
Beetles described in 1958
Monotypic Cerambycidae genera